Mall: Music from the Motion Picture is the original motion picture soundtrack for the 2014 American drama film Mall, consisting of songs written, recorded and performed by Chester Bennington, Dave Farrell, Joe Hahn and Mike Shinoda (from American rock band Linkin Park) with Alec Puro, drummer of American rock band Deadsy. It was released through Warner Bros. and Machine Shop on December 12, 2014. The soundtrack was produced by Mike Shinoda and Brad Delson, along with Rob Cavallo and Bill Boyd, who both served as executive producers.

Available in the Australian and New Zealand iTunes stores.

Background 
The music for the film was composed by Deadsy drummer Alec Puro and Linkin Park members Chester Bennington, Dave "Phoenix" Farrell, Joe Hahn and Mike Shinoda. The soundtrack for The Seed, the first installment by Hahn, contains three songs. One of them was "There They Go" by Fort Minor (originally from its studio debut album, The Rising Tied) played during the credits, and the other two were untitled and were played while the fighting scenes. It was rumored that the soundtrack for this film would have a few songs by Linkin Park and some would be from their new studio album The Hunting Party, but it was however proven to be false. The soundtrack for the film was released under the Warner Bros. and Machine Shop record labels on December 12, 2014.

In a tweet-out session, Joe answered the question about the score: "The movie is done! The score is finished! And we are putting it out to distributors and see who's going to put it out. So it's going to come soon." A song named as "It Goes Through", which Shinoda provides lead vocals on for the 2-minute trailer that was released on May 28, 2014 in promotion for Mall, was featured in the movie trailer, which could be the first single from the soundtrack of the film.

On September 16, 2014, the song "The Last Line" (originally known as "Ammosick"), under the name "Mall (Theme song)", was released through YouTube along with the download. This was also shared on the official page of the film.

On October 15, 2014, the band confirmed that the song "White Noise" is featured during the opening credits of Mall. On October 17, 2014, the song was available for free in digital download formatted in its entire length through the official Mall website. The song was released as a promotional single as a free download also at the website of the band. The song is also available on the band's official YouTube channel.

Recording
The songs and score for the soundtrack were all recorded for the soundtrack from 2011 to 2013. The band recorded the soundtrack in parallel of recording their fifth studio album, Living Things (2012). The soundtrack was also recorded parallel to their second remix album Recharged (2013), and some sessions for their sixth studio album The Hunting Party (2014). Some songs were remastering of the demos by the band, which they had previously recorded.

The song "Devil's Drop" (originally known as "Warm Spell") was a demo during the recording sessions of Living Things, "It Goes Through" (originally known as "Luna") was one of the demos for the recordings of the EP written and composed by Shinoda for Dell's LP Stagelight, "White Noise" was a demo during the recording sessions of The Hunting Party (which is now available in digital download), and "The Last Line" was a demo from the band's third studio album Minutes to Midnight (2007), but was worked on for their fourth studio album A Thousand Suns (2010), which is now released in digital download format, as it was confirmed on the official Facebook page to Mall.

Track listing

Credits
Music and performance by Chester Bennington, Dave Farrell, Joe Hahn, Mike Shinoda & Alec Puro
Score produced by Mike Shinoda, Joe Hahn and Alec Puro
Executive in Charge of Music for Paragon Pictures: Erika Hampson
Music supervisor: The Collective
Album compiled by M.P.S.E., Irl Sanders
Art direction and design by Frank Maddocks
Music recorded and mixed by Shie Rozow
Music production services: Etan Mates
Supervising music editor: Shie Rozow
Additional music by Alaina Blair
Music preparation: Ryan Neil
Music contractors: Ryan Neil (from The Collective)
Engineering: Ethan Mates
Engineering assistants: Jennifer Langdon, Brendan Dekora and Alejandro Baima
Synth programming: Mike Shinoda
Mixing: Neal Avron
Mastering: Emily Lazar, Brian "Big Bass" Gardner
Mastering assistance:''' Rich Morales
Lead vocals: Mike Shinoda
Backing vocals: Mike Shinoda
Vocals: Chester Bennington
Guitars: Mike Shinoda
Bass guitar: Dave "Phoenix" Farrell
Drums: Alec Puro
Turntables: Joe Hahn
Keyboards: Mike Shinoda
Sampling and programming: Joe Hahn and Mike Shinoda

Release history

References

Linkin Park albums
Film scores
2014 soundtrack albums